A clachan (  or  ;) is a small settlement or hamlet on the island of Ireland, the Isle of Man and Scotland.  Though many were originally kirktowns, today they are often thought of as small villages lacking a church, post office, or other formal building.  It is likely that many date to medieval times or earlier – a cluster of small single-storey cottages of farmers and/or fishermen, invariably found on poorer land. They were often related to the rundale system of farming. 

According to David Lloyd, the Great Famine in Ireland (1845–49) caused such disruption to the social system that the clachans there virtually disappeared; many in the Scottish Highlands were victims of the Clearances. In some cases, they have evolved into holiday villages, or one or two houses have taken over, turning smaller houses into agricultural outhouses.  Remains can be seen in many upland and coastal areas.  Some are clustered in a dip in the landscape, to protect from Atlantic winds, but others stretch haphazardly along main roads.

Etymology
The word is composed of two elements, clach/cloch meaning "stone" and the masculine diminutive suffix -an/-án. It originally denoted one of two things:
 a monastic stone-cell (clochán).
 a paved road or causeway which in the earliest period were most commonly found leading to or from a church or cell

This should not be confused with the Scottish Gaelic plural of clach which is clachan "stones", a homonym.

Examples
In Ireland:
 Cloghane in County Kerry
 Cloghan, County Offaly
 Cloghan, County Donegal
 Cloghanmore in Donegal
 Menlo/Mionloch in Galway

In the meaning of "causeway", the most prominent example in Irish is the Giant's Causeway, known in Irish as Clochán an Aifir or Clochán na bhFomhórach.

In Scotland, clachans can be found in Argyll and Bute, Highland Perthshire and in the Highland Council region but also elsewhere, for example:
 Clachan, Cowal, Argyll and Bute
 Clachan, Lismore, Argyll and Bute
 Clachan, Kintyre, Argyll and Bute
 Clachan, Ross and Cromarty, Highland
 Clachan, Skye, Highland
 Clachan, Sutherland, Highland
 Clachan, Raasay on the Isle of Raasay, Highland
 Clachan, South Uist, Outer Hebrides
 Clachan of Campsie
 Clachan of Glendaruel in Argyll
 Clachaneasy in Galloway
 Hessilhead in North Ayrshire
 Bloak in East Ayrshire
 Ladeside in East Ayrshire
 Damnaglaur in the Rinns of Galloway

In Canada:
 Clachan, Ontario, Canada

Notes

External links 
The Glens of Antrim Historical Society includes a substantial section on Clachans in County Antrim

Rural geography
Hamlets
Types of populated places